The Okinawa Airakuen Sanatorium (or National Sanatorium Okinawa Airakuen) is a sanatorium for current or former leprosy patients in Nago, Okinawa, Japan that was established in 1938.

History

History before the sanatorium

Major events
On November 10, 1938, the sanatorium first opened as the Okinawa Prefectural Kunigami Airakuen Sanatorium. In April 1941, it was renamed the National Kunigami Airakuen Sanatorium.
April 25, 1946: operated by United States Military Government
April 1, 1952: transferred to the newly created Ryukyu Government
August 26, 1961: Leprosy Prevention Law is promulgated in Okinawa
May 15, 1972: Okinawa returned to Japan. Renamed the National Sanatorium Okinawa Airakuen.
April 1, 1996: Leprosy Prevention Law is abolished

World War II
The Japanese army admitted nearly 400 new leprosy patients in September 1944 for around 913 patients. The high population led to food shortages, and housing conditions were deplorable. When the Battle of Okinawa began in April 1945, the sanatorium director Hiroshi Hayata allowed patients to leave and avoid the battle. By the end of April, US forces had occupied the sanatorium.

After World War II
August 1945: the director of the army hospital visits the sanatorium.
March 8, 1946: the Yagaji Sanatorium on Yagaji Island becomes the restricted area
1949: Dr. V. Scorebrand visits the sanatorium and tries to use promin.
July 1953: Dr. Doull visits Okinawa for two months and reports various recommendations concerning leprosy.
March 1951: Okinawa 'Save the Leprosy Patients' Association is founded
February 1954: the Jichikai (patients' association) for Airakuen founds the Tomonokai association for those discharged from Airakuen and Miyako Nanseien Sanatoriums.
February 1960: the outpatient clinic is started in Naha. Similar clinics are later built on the islands of Ishigakijima and Miyakojima
March 1957: the Japanese Government begins sending leprosy specialists to two Okinawan sanatoriums.
1967: Okinawan schoolchildren surveys begin
April  1996: Leprosy Prevention Law of 1953 is abolished
July 1998: trial for compensation begins
May 11, 2001: previous Leprosy Prevention Law is ruled unconstitutional during the trial
May 25, 2001: trial for compensation is decided. 8 to 14 million yen is given to patients depending on the duration of the unconstitutional period.

Number of patients

See also
Nami Matsuda
Keisai Aoki

Notes

References
 The transitions of the leprosy policy (1999) Kazuo Saikawa, Okinawa Leprosy Prevention Association. in Japanese.

External links
Airakuen Sanatorium HP, in Japanese

Hospital buildings completed in 1938
Hospitals in Japan
Leper hospitals
Buildings and structures in Okinawa Prefecture
Hospitals established in 1938
Leprosy in Japan